Schley may refer to:

People with the surname
 Julian Larcombe Schley (1880–1965), Governor of the Panama Canal Zone from 1932 to 1936.
 William Schley (1786–1858), an American politician
 Winfield Scott Schley (1839–1911), an American admiral

Places
United States
 Schley, Indiana, an unincorporated community
 Schley, Minnesota, an unincorporated community
 Schley, North Carolina, an unincorporated community
 Schley, Wisconsin, a town
 Schley County, Georgia
Greenland
 G.B. Schley Fjord

Ships
 Two United States Navy ships have been named USS Schley